The 1979 Arizona State Sun Devils football team represented Arizona State University in the 1979 NCAA Division I-A football season, and competed as a member of the Pacific-10 Conference (Pac-10). The team was led by head coach Frank Kush through the first five games and by Bob Owens for the final seven games. They finished with a record of six wins and six losses (6–6, 3–4 Pac-10). The offense scored 306 points while the defense allowed 208 points. The team later vacated five victories.

Schedule

Reference:

Season summary

Washington
Frank Kush, who was coaching in his final collegiate game, was carried onto the field before the game and then off of the field following Arizona State's upset.

Personnel

1979 team players in the NFL
The following players were claimed in the 1980 NFL Draft.

Reference:

References

Arizona State
Arizona State Sun Devils football seasons
Arizona State Sun Devils football